Michael J. Meaney, CM, CQ, FRSC, (born 1951) is a professor at McGill University specializing in biological psychiatry, neurology, and neurosurgery, who is primarily known for his research on stress, maternal care, and gene expression. His research team has "discovered the importance of maternal care in modifying the expression of genes that regulate behavioral and neuroendocrine responses to stress, as well as hippocampal synaptic development" in animal studies. The research has implications for domestic and public policy for maternal support and its role in human disease prevention and economic health.

Meaney is associate director of the Research Centre at the Douglas Mental Health University Institute, director of the Program for the Study of Behaviour, Genes and Environment, and James McGill Professor, Departments of Psychiatry and Neurology and Neurosurgery, McGill University. He was named a "Most Highly Cited Scientist" in the area of neuroscience by the Institute for Scientific Information in 2007 and was also elected to the Royal Society of Canada and named a Knight of the National Order of Quebec. For research on stress he has received a Senior Scientist Career Award from the Canadian Institutes of Health Research in 1997. He also, along with fellow researcher from the Douglas Institute Dr. Gustavo Turecki, was awarded the Scientist of the Year Award by Radio-Canada.  In 2011, he was made a member of the Order of Canada.

Animal studies 

Meaney is an expert in stress and epigenetics, with hundreds of papers and thousands of citations culminating in a h-index of 135 as of 2019. Meaney has studied the epigenetic effects of stressors ranging from aversive early life experience to obesity. His early research focused on the relationship between maternal care and stress response in rat pups. This work demonstrated that pups removed from their maternal environment and handled for 15 minutes per day had lower hypothalamic-pituitary-adrenal responses than pups separated from their mothers for 3 hours per day and pups with no handling whatsoever. Meaney hypothesized that these changes were related to glucocorticoid receptor density and its role in hypothalamic-pituitary-adrenal axis feedback.  Meaney and colleagues tested his hypothesis by examining the effect of maternal care on GR expression. They separated mother rats into two groups: high licking and grooming mothers and low licking and grooming mothers. Pups of high licking and grooming mothers had a significantly greater density of glucocorticoid receptors in their hippocampi than pups of low licking and grooming mothers. This research was the first to establish a causational relationship between maternal care and behavioral epigenetic programming by cross fostering pups. Meaney also studied this causal relationship between maternal care and epigenetic programming in estrogen receptor expression in the medial pre-optic area of the brain. The behavioral results showed that high licking and grooming mothers birth pups that grow to be high licking and grooming mothers, even with cross fostering.   Meaney's animal research and hypotheses are broadly applicable, showing similar results when applied to humans.

Human studies 

Meaney’s early research provided impetus for applied behavioral epigenetic research in humans. His first study compared suicidal subjects with a history of child abuse to suicidal subjects without a history of child abuse. Meaney found further evidence to support his hippocampal glucocorticoid receptor hypothesis when he discovered that abuse victims had less expression of hippocampal glucocorticoid receptors than both non-abused suicide victims and non-suicidal subjects. This suggests that childhood abuse alters the hippocampus in a way that is related to suicidal behavior.

Publications

Books

See also
Epigenetics
Douglas Hospital

References

External links
 Researcher Profile - Michael Meaney, Douglas Mental Health University Institute affiliated with McGill University 
 Lab website

1951 births
Living people
Canadian neuroscientists
Knights of the National Order of Quebec
Academic staff of McGill University
Members of the Order of Canada
Fellows of the Royal Society of Canada